Fira Sans is a humanist sans-serif typeface designed by Erik Spiekermann, Ralph du Carrois, Anja Meiners, Botio Nikoltchev of Carrois Type Design and Patryk Adamczyk of Mozilla Corporation. Originally commissioned by Telefónica and Mozilla Corporation as part of the joint effort during the development of Firefox OS. It is a slightly wider and calmer adaptation of Spiekermann's typeface Meta, which was used at Mozilla's brand typeface at the time but optimized for legibility on (small) screens. With the name Fira, Mozilla wanted to communicate the concepts of fire, light and joy but in a language agnostic way to signal the project's global nature. Fira was released in 2013 initially under the Apache License and later reissued under the SIL Open Font License.

In its initial 2013 release, Fira Sans was available in four weights with corresponding italics: light, regular, medium, and bold.
In May 2014, the number of weights was increased to 16. In 2015, Mozilla added a condensed style. The family has a large character set including text figures and small caps.

Fira Sans is the font of choice for the Government of New Zealand and the Government of Iceland.

Fira Mono

Fira Sans is accompanied by a monospaced variant called Fira Mono, available in regular, medium, and bold.

Fira Code
Fira Code is an extension of the Fira Mono font containing a set of ligatures for common programming multi-character combinations. Considered one of the best programming fonts, it is available in regular, medium, bold and light, and as a variable weight font.

Fira Go

In March 2018, a multilingual extension named FiraGo (stylised as FiraGO) was released. It has Arabic, Devanagari, Georgian, Hebrew and Thai letters in addition to Latin, Greek and Cyrillic alphabets in the typeface. It was commissioned by Here Technologies. FiraGo was released as a separate product, and will be the main font family in the group. All future updates to Fira Sans will be based on FiraGo and as of 2018, all Fira families are issued by bBox Type, which is headed by Ralph du Carrois and Anja Meiners.

Fira Math 
Released in 2019, Fira Math is a sans-serif font with Unicode math support and is developed by Stone Zeng.

References

External links
 
 
 
 Fira Sans and Mono at bBox Type
 FiraGo at bBox Type
 Fira Sans on Google Fonts
 Fira Sans Condensed on Google Fonts
 Fira Sans Extra Condensed on Google Fonts
 Fira Mono on Google Fonts

Humanist sans-serif typefaces
Free software Unicode typefaces
Firefox OS
Typefaces with text figures
Typefaces designed by Erik Spiekermann
Monospaced typefaces
Typefaces and fonts introduced in 2013
IPA typefaces